Raimondo Epifanio (1440–1482) was an Italian painter of the Renaissance period. Born in Naples. He studied under Silvestro Buono. One of his pupils was Andrea Sabbatini.

Sources

1440 births
1482 deaths
15th-century Neapolitan people
15th-century Italian painters
Italian male painters
Painters from Naples
Italian Renaissance painters